This is a list of NCAA Division I schools that have advanced to the College World Series as part of the Division I baseball tournament.

Appearances

See also
 College World Series
 List of NCAA Division I baseball programs

Notes

References

Appearances
College World Series appearances